Jean Chartier (1500–1580) was a French painter, draughtsman, and print publisher.

Chartier was known to be working in Orléans. His style suggests that he may have seen or been involved in the School of Fontainebleau.

References

1500 births
1580 deaths
16th-century French painters
French draughtsmen
French male painters